Pimelea leptospermoides, commonly known as serpentine rice flower, is a species of flowering plant in the family Thymelaeaceae and is endemic to Queensland. It is a shrub with narrowly egg-shaped to elliptic leaves and white, tube-shaped flowers arranged in groups of up to 7.

Description
Flowering occurs from May to October.

Taxonomy
Pimelea leptospermoides was first formally described in 1869 by Ferdinand von Mueller in Fragmenta Phytographiae Australiae from specimens collected near the Tropic of Capricorn by Anthelme Thozet.

In 2017, Anthony Bean described two subspecies of P. leptospermoides and the names are accepted by the Australian Plant Census:
 Pimelea leptospermoides subsp. bowmanii (F.Muell. ex Benth.)

Distribution and habitat
This pimelea grows on stony hillsides and in the understory of shrubby woodland, in serpentine soils from near Marlborough to near Rockhampton in north Queensland. Subspecies bowmanni is found west Canoona and subsp. leptospermoides between Canoona and Marlborough.

Conservation status
Pimelea leptospermoides is listed as "vulnerable" under the Australian Government Environment Protection and Biodiversity Conservation Act 1999 and as "near threatened"  under the Queensland Government Nature Conservation Act 1992.

References

Malvales of Australia
leptospermoides
Flora of Queensland
Taxa named by Ferdinand von Mueller
Plants described in 1869